Taipale may refer to:
Taipale (surname), a common family name in Finland
Taipale, former name of Solovyovo, a rural locality in Leningrad Oblast, Russia
The Battle of Taipale, fought between Soviet and Finnish forces during the Winter War